The International Primary Curriculum (IPC) is an independent programme of education for learners aged 5 to 11, cited by The SAGE Handbook of Research in International Education in 2015 as one of the three major international systems of education and one of two identified programmes specifically with international education objectives. The IPC forms part of a continuum of curricula, including the International Early Years Curriculum (IEYC) and the International Middle Years Curriculum (IMYC), and was identified as forming a key part of the rise in international education.

History
The curriculum was developed in the late 1990s by a group of international school educators and the support of Shell Oil's international education division and was launched as a standalone international curriculum in 2000.

Curriculum design
From the IPC Curriculum Guide (2020), the design of the IPC cites 7 foundations that present the curriculum as a holistic programme of education for 5-11 year-olds, separated into three 'mileposts' (5–6 years old, 7–9 years old, and 10–11 years old). The 7 foundations are listed as:
 Learner-focused Personal, International and Subject Learning Goals
 A Progressive Pedagogy
 A Process to Facilitate Learning for All
 Globally Competent Learners
 Knowledge, Skills and Understanding are taught, learned and assessed differently
 Connected Learning
 Assessment for Improving Learning

Thematic units of learning
The IPC is presented to schools through a number of thematic units of learning, which bring together the learning of multiple subjects associated with that theme over a 3, 6 or 9 week period. All the units follow the same Process to Facilitate Learning, which has the following stages:
 Entry Point
 Knowledge Harvest
 Explaining the Theme
 Research, Record and Reflect activities
 Exit Point

Personal learning goals
The 8 Personal Learning Goals of the IPC are:
 Adaptable
 (a) Communicator
 (a) Collaborator
 Empathetic
 Ethical
 Resilient
 Respectful
 (a) Thinker

Subject learning goals
The subjects included in the IPC subject learning goals are:
 Art
 Design technology and Innovation
 Geography
 Health and Wellbeing
 History
 ICT and Computing
 Language Arts
 Mathematics
 Music
 Physical education
 Science

Use in schools around the world 
As of 2021, the IPC is used by over 1,000 international schools in over 90 countries.

References 

Curricula